Marc J. Rowan (born August 19, 1962) is an American billionaire private equity investor. He is co-founder and CEO of Apollo Global Management.

Early life and education
Rowan was born to a Jewish family in 1962. His mother Barbara was a teacher and a trained concert pianist. He has one sister, Andrea. Rowan graduated summa cum laude with a B.S. and an M.B.A. from the Wharton School of the University of Pennsylvania.

Career
Rowan joined the Mergers & Acquisitions Group of Drexel Burnham Lambert where he worked in New York City and Los Angeles. In 1990, Rowan co-founded the private equity firm Apollo Global Management with former Drexel Burnham colleagues Leon Black and Joshua Harris. The firm went public in March 2011.

Philanthropy
He is a founding member and serves on the executive committee of the Youth Renewal Fund and is a member of the board of directors for the National Jewish Outreach Program, the New York Police Foundation and serves on the board of trustees of the University of Pennsylvania and the board of advisors of the Wharton School of the University of Pennsylvania. In October 2018, he donated $50 million to the Wharton School, the largest single gift in Wharton’s history. The funds would be used to recruit three Rowan Distinguished Professors, appoint Rowan Fellows and support the Penn Wharton Budget Model.

Personal life
Rowan is married to Carolyn G. Pleva and lives in New York City.

References

American investors
20th-century American Jews
Living people
American billionaires
Wharton School of the University of Pennsylvania alumni
Drexel Burnham Lambert
Apollo Global Management people
1962 births
21st-century American Jews